Lisa Kelly  is an Irish singer (born 1977)

Lisa Kelly may also refer to:

 Lisa Kelly (trucker) (born 1980), American truck driver
 Lisa Robin Kelly (1970–2013), American actress

See also
 Kelly (surname)